Severed Ties is a 1992 comedy horror film directed by Damon Santostefano. It was released to video by Columbia TriStar Home Video.

Premise 
A regeneration experiment on a severed arm goes awry, turning the limb into a murderous, reptilian creature.

Cast 
Oliver Reed - Doctor Hans Vaughan
Elke Sommer - Helena Harrison
Garrett Morris - Stripes
Billy Morrissette - Harrison Harrison
Johnny Legend - Preacher
Roger Perkovich - Lorenz
Denise Wallace - Eve
Bekki Vallin - Uta

External links

1992 films
American horror films
Films directed by Damon Santostefano
1992 horror films
1992 directorial debut films
Films scored by Daniel Licht
1992 direct-to-video films
1990s English-language films
1990s American films